Per Flensburg is a Swedish author, researcher, and professor at University College West. In a paper on Information Systems Research in Scandinavia he was named as one of the top 5 authors in this field based on his extensive research output.

History
In 1986 Flensburg defended his doctoral thesis (End User Computing - introduction, consequences, possibilities) at Lund University. That same year he became a member of the teaching staff at Copenhagen Business School. In 1996, he began to work for Växjö University where he was appointed Professor in 2002. Per Flensburg joined the faculty as a Professor of Informatics at University College West in 2006. He retired in 2013 and is from 2018 professor in informatics at Strömstad academy. His career is described in an article in Scandinavian Journal of Information Systems

Research
As a researcher Flensburg has primarily focused on user participation in the development of information systems. He has published numerous articles and books, among these "Knowledge Spillovers And Knowledge Management", co-edited with Charlie Karlsson and Sven Ake Horte, which became widely receipted among an interdisciplinary research community. Although he has spent some time on the different problems that arise when users of varying backgrounds and paradigms interpret specific terms in an information system differently. Along with heading research at the various universities for which he worked, Flensburg was also a research leader of CeLeKT Research Center. He has written a thesis about paradigm shift in information systems.

Teaching 
Flensburg has devoted a lot of effort to education. Some of his lectures and courses are presented at the homepage,  and some of his articles and slides are presented at another page.

See also 
 Information Systems Research in Scandinavia
 Knowledge Spillover
 University College West

References

External links 
 Per Flensburg Homepage Contains lectures, papers and movies
 

1946 births
Living people
Swedish male writers
Information systems researchers
Academic staff of Copenhagen Business School